William Burnell was the Dean of Wells during 1292.

References

Deans of Wells
13th-century English people